Sphenothallus is a problematic extinct genus lately attributed to the conulariids. It was widespread in shallow marine environments during the Paleozoic.

Occurrence 
Sphenothallus is represented in the Cambrian period in the Kaili biota and the Mount Stephen trilobite beds, where it co-occurs with the similar organisms Cambrorhythium and Byronia. It is known in younger strata in Canada and the US, surviving at least until the Mississippian.

Ecology 
Sphenothallus lived in groups as an opportunist in environments from hardgrounds to soft mud, even if depleted in oxygen. It probably dispersed via larvae.

Notes

References

External links 
 

Burgess Shale fossils
Staurozoa